The Two Marshals is a 1961 Italian comedy film written and directed by Sergio Corbucci. The film was a hit at the Italian box office, with 2.765.531 spectators and a total gross of 536.513.000 lire.

Plot 
In Italy, during 1943, two men collide during the bombing of the Nazis and American allies. Antonio Capurro is a thief who disguises himself as a priest for the robberies at the train stations; Vittorio Cotone is a carabinieri marshal upright who's chasing Antonio, and that in the end, to a misunderstanding, he is forced to do so by Marshal dress. Antonio is excited about the new appointment, and Vittorio meanwhile disguises himself as a priest. In fact the two, in the days of the Badoglio Proclamation, are persecuted by the Nazis and fascists because they're hiding a partisan, a Jewish girl and an American soldier who is planning the Allied landing.

Cast 
Totò as Antonio Capurro
Vittorio De Sica as Marshal Vittorio Cotone
Gianni Agus as Achille Pennica, the Podestà
Arturo Bragaglia as Don Nicola
Franco Giacobini as Basilio Meneghetti 
Elvy Lissiak as Vanda
Roland Bartrop (billed as Roland von Bartrop) as Lieutenant Kessler
Olimpia Cavalli as Immacolata Di Rosa  
Mario Castellani as the Thief
Mimmo Poli as the Postman
Bruno Corelli as Benegatti, the Lawyer

References

External links

Italian comedy films
Films directed by Sergio Corbucci
1961 comedy films
1961 films
Films set in 1943
Films about Italian resistance movement
Italian Campaign of World War II films
Films with screenplays by Giovanni Grimaldi
Films scored by Piero Piccioni
1960s Italian-language films
1960s Italian films